The 2004 OFC Men's Olympic Football Tournament, the fourth edition of the OFC Men's Olympic Qualifying Tournament, offered the winning Oceania Football Confederation (OFC) national under-23 side a place to compete at the quadrennial Summer Olympic Games. Australia won the tournament, and therefore the spot for the Athens Games of 2004.

Matches

Group A

Group B

Final
First Leg

Second Leg

Goalscorers
7 goals
 Jean Maleb
 Shane Smeltz

6 goals
 Lorry Thompsen
 Dylan Macallister

5 goals
 Allan Pearce

4 goals

 Brent Fisher
 Ahmad Elrich
 Brett Holman
 Thomas Vulivuli

3 goals
 Nathaniel Lepani
 Isaac Kapi

2 goals

 Luke Wilkshire
 Nicky Carle
 Veresa Toma
 Alexander Davani
 Richmond Faaiuaso
 Jerry Sam
 Alick Maemae
 Duane Atuelevao 
 Tuka Tisam
 James Pritchett
 Jarrod Smith
 Dimitri Yakeula
 Alphose Qorig

References

External links
 Statistics at Sporting Pulse

OFC
Olympic Football Tournament, 2004
Oly
2004
2004